Rowenta is a German manufacturer of small household appliances. Since 1988, it has been part of the global French Groupe SEB. The German subsidiary is Rowenta Werke GmbH in Erbach in the Odenwald district in Hesse.

History
Robert Ferdinand August Weintraud (1860-1927) founded Robert Weintraud GmbH & Co KG in 1884, and trademarked the brand name Rowenta, an acronym of the company's full name, in December 1909. His family lived in Offenbach am Main.

The company initially used the slogan Muss heute eine Rowenta sein (today [it] must be a Rowenta). In 2005 they introduced Intelligent Beauty. In 2014, they introduced the new slogan "Enjoy Technology"

Product Introductions
 1919 - an electric iron
 1926 - the first electric coffee maker for restaurants
 1949 - the first iron with a thermostat (with ceramic heating elements)
 1957 - the first steam iron
 1967 - hair drying bonnet
 1971 - KG-22 coffee maker (Filtermatic)
 1974 - its first vacuum cleaner
 2001 - bagless vacuum cleaner (Infinium)

Ownership
Rowenta was bought by the French Groupe SEB in 1988.

Structure
The company is based in Erbach im Odenwald in Odenwaldkreis. It is located off the B43 next to the A661 bridge over the River Main, in the Gewerbegebiet Kaiserlei near the Best Western Macrander Hotel. The site is also the headquarters of Groupe SEB Deutschland.

References

External links
Official Website

Coffee appliance vendors
Companies based in Hesse
Electronics companies established in 1884
Home appliance brands
Manufacturing companies of Germany
German brands
Offenbach am Main
German companies established in 1884
1988 mergers and acquisitions